Jesús Dueñas Llerenas (born 26 October 1944) is a Mexican politician affiliated with the PAN. He served as Deputy of the LVIII Legislature of the Mexican Congress representing Colima. He also served as Senator during the LX and LXI Legislatures, as well as the municipal president of Villa de Álvarez, Colima.

References

1944 births
Living people
Politicians from Colima
Members of the Senate of the Republic (Mexico)
Members of the Chamber of Deputies (Mexico)
National Action Party (Mexico) politicians
21st-century Mexican politicians
People from Villa de Álvarez, Colima
20th-century Mexican politicians
Municipal presidents in Colima
Autonomous University of Chihuahua alumni